The Yango Longking Group is a Chinese private company active in the financial and construction industry.

Yango Longking was founded in 1995 as Yango Financial Holding Investment Group Co., Ltd, adopting its current name in 2018. Its headquarters are in the Fuzhou International Finance Center and North Bund, Shanghai.

Yango Longking was ranked 332nd in the Fortune Global 500 for 2021.

The company received a bailout from the state-owned China Huarong Asset Management in August 2022, in what was described by the South China Morning Post as "the result of Beijing seeking the stabilisation of the property market."

References

External links
 

Chinese companies established in 1995
Companies based in Fuzhou
Holding companies of China